The Serie B 1958–59 was the twenty-seventh tournament of this competition played in Italy since its creation.

Teams
Reggiana and Vigevano had been promoted from Serie C, while Atalanta and Hellas Verona had been relegated from Serie A.

Final classification

Results

References and sources
Almanacco Illustrato del Calcio - La Storia 1898-2004, Panini Edizioni, Modena, September 2005

Serie B seasons
2
Italy